San Nazzaro Val Cavargna is a comune (municipality) in the Province of Como in the Italian region Lombardy, located about  north of Milan and about  north of Como, on the border with Switzerland.

San Nazzaro Val Cavargna borders the following municipalities: Carlazzo, Cavargna, Garzeno, Germasino, San Bartolomeo Val Cavargna, Sant'Antonio (Switzerland), Val Rezzo.

Demographic evolution

References

Cities and towns in Lombardy